Lim Hng Kiang (born 9 April 1954) is a Singaporean former politician who served as Minister for Trade and Industry between 2004 and 2018, Minister in the Prime Minister's Office between 2003 and 2004, Minister for Health between 1999 and 2003 and Minister for National Development between 1994 and 1999. A member of the governing People's Action Party (PAP), he was the Member of Parliament (MP) for the Telok Blangah division of Tanjong Pagar GRC between 1991 and 1997 and later West Coast GRC 1997 and 2020.

Education
Lim was educated in Raffles Institution, before being awarded a President's Scholarship and Singapore Armed Forces Overseas Scholarship to study at the University of Cambridge, where he completed a degree in engineering in 1976. In 1985, Lim was awarded a scholarship to study for a Master of Public Administration degree at the John F. Kennedy School of Government at Harvard University.

Career
Lim began his career in the Singapore Armed Forces (SAF) and left with rank of lieutenant-colonel. He later served as a deputy secretary at the Ministry of National Development, and as the chief executive officer (CEO) of the Housing and Development Board (HDB).

Lim was first elected to Parliament in 1991 as an MP for the Tanjong Pagar Group Representation Constituency. Since 1997, he has represented the West Coast Group Representation Constituency (West Coast GRC).

Lim was appointed a Minister of State at the Ministry of National Development in 1991. In 1994, he became the Acting Minister for National Development and Senior Minister of State at the Ministry of Foreign Affairs.

In 1995, Lim became the Minister for National Development and Second Minister for Foreign Affairs. In 1998, he relinquished the role of Second Minister for Foreign Affairs and became the Second Minister for Finance.

In 1999, Lim became the Minister for Health. He also retained the portfolio of Second Minister for Finance.

During the severe acute respiratory syndrome (SARS) epidemic that swept through the region. Many Singaporeans felt his initial handling of the crisis, citing his lack of leadership and indecisiveness, helped prolong the epidemic that eventually drove the economy into a recession. While then Deputy Prime Minister Lee Hsien Loong said "SARS has significantly disrupted our economy. It has affected not only tourist spending but also domestic consumption... certainly our first half growth will be affected, and we will have to revise down our growth forecasts for the year." Others cited his calls to quarantine patients and to close and extend local school holidays were late in coming.

Many local residents also pointed to the administrators at Tan Tock Seng Hospital for mishandling and underestimating the severity of SARS. When "At least 85 percent of people infected by SARS in Singapore caught it while visiting or working at hospitals", said Osman David Mansoor at the WHO. "The remainder mostly came down with it at home through close contact with sick family members", he said.

In 2003, Lim was made a minister in the Prime Minister's Office. He retained the role of Second Minister for Finance.

Lim was made the Minister for Trade and Industry in 2004. He was subsequently put in charge of trade at the Ministry of Trade and Industry. The ministry was split into two, with Lim taking the trade portfolio and the industry portfolio taken by S. Iswaran.

Lim served as the deputy chairman of the Monetary Authority of Singapore (MAS) from 2006 until 2021 and is also a board director of the Government of Singapore Investment Corporation (GIC).

Lim stepped down from the cabinet on 30 April 2018 and appointed as special advisor to MTI.

During 2020 Singaporean general election, Lim announced his retirement from politics.

Personal life
Lim has two sons. His wife, Lee Ai Boon, died of cancer on 12 April 2014.

References

External links 

Ministry of Trade & Industry Official Website – Arquivo.pt
Lim Hng Kiang's profile as member of Singapore Parliament – AbtUs/OrgStr/Members of Parliament/LimHngKiang
MAS　Annual　Report 2007/2008 – Monetary Authority of Singapore Annual Report 2007/08
MAS: Board and Management
GIC - About Us - GIC Board of Directors

 

1954 births
Living people
Alumni of Christ's College, Cambridge
Harvard Kennedy School alumni
Members of the Cabinet of Singapore
Members of the Parliament of Singapore
People's Action Party politicians
President's Scholars
Raffles Institution alumni
Singaporean people of Teochew descent
Ministers for Health of Singapore
Ministers for Trade and Industry of Singapore